A  is a fictitious being from Japanese folklore belonging to the group of Yōkais.

Description 
The Bakezōri is described as a wandering sandal with two arms and two legs, but only one eye. He is said to spook inhabited households during the night, running around and continuously chanting: "Kararin, kororin, kankororin, managu mittsu ni ha ninmai!" ("Kararin, kororin, kankororin! They have three eyes and two teeth!"). Most possibly he's mocking his "more noble cousins", the famous Geta.

Background 
Design model of the Bakezōri may have been Zōri, traditional sandals made of braided rice straw.

The being Bakezōri belongs to a special group of Yōkai, called Tsukumogami ("artifact-demons"): According to Japanese folklore, households are like repair tools, kitchen appliances and even clothes of any kind which eventually come to life and receive their own consciousness when ignored or neglected for a long time (mostly after 100 years). Bakezōri are said to be normally harmless to humans, but they can start to rip or pester them. Their motivation is boredom and frustration, or simply revenge and jealousy. Most Bakezōri group up with other animated household stuff or clothes, or they simply leave home and run away.

Sources

External links 
 Short info about Bake-zori at yokai.com (Japanese)

Tsukumogami